Following his win in the 2021 Zambian general election on 24 August 2021, Hakainde Hichilema made a number of international trips as President of Zambia.

Summary of international trips

2021 
The following international trips were made by Hakainde Hichilema in 2021.

2022 
The following international trips were made by Hakainde Hichilema in 2022.

2023 
The following international trips were made by Hakainde Hichilema in 2023.

References 

Hakainde Hichilema
2021 in international relations
Hichilema, Hakainde
Hichilema, Hakainde
 
Hichilema, Hakainde
Hichilema